The Upsurging People's Force is a militant group in Sri Lanka. 

The group was unknown until February 2006, when it claimed responsibility for a series of attacks on Sri Lankan army and navy cadre in the north and east of Sri Lanka in December 2005 and January 2006.  It claimed responsibility for a series of further claymore mine attacks on soldiers and police officers on 15 April 2006, but has not issued any public communiques since then.

See also

References

External links
Communique from UPF Tamilnet.com report

Factions in the Sri Lankan Civil War
Tamil Eelam
Paramilitary organisations based in Sri Lanka
2005 in Sri Lanka
2006 in Sri Lanka
Liberation Tigers of Tamil Eelam